This is a list of venues used for professional or NCAA baseball in Portland, Oregon. The information is a compilation of the information contained in the references listed.

Name and location of ballpark(s) unknown
Portland Gladiators - Pacific Northwest League (1890-1892)
Portland - New Pacific League (1896 - disbanded mid-season)
Portland Gladiators - Pacific Northwest League (1898)

National Park
Home of: Portland Greengages - Pacific National League (formerly Pacific Northwest League) (1903 only to mid-season)
Location: E 8th Street [SE 8th Ave] (west); Hawthorne Avenue [SE Hawthorne Blvd] (south) in East Portland
Currently: Commercial businesses

Vaughn Street Park a.k.a. Lucky Beavers Stadium, originally Recreation Park
Home of:
Portland Webfoots - Pacific Northwest League (1901-02)
Portland Browns/Giants/Beavers - Pacific Coast League (1903-1917)
Buckaroos - Pacific Coast International League (1918)
Portland Beavers - Pacific Coast League (1919-55)
Portland Pippins/Colts - Northwest League (1911-1914)
Location: 2409 Northwest Vaughn Street (south, third base); Northwest 24th Avenue (east, first base); Northwest 25th Avenue (west, left field)
Currently: ESCO plant

Providence Park formerly Jeld-Wen Field, PGE Park, Civic Stadium, Multnomah Stadium, Multnomah Field 
Home of:
Portland Giants - Pacific Coast League (part of 1905 season)
Portland Beavers - Pacific Coast League (1956-1972)
Portland Mavericks - Northwest League (1973-1977)
Portland Beavers - Pacific Coast League (1978-93)
Portland Rockies - Northwest League (1995-2000)
Portland Beavers - Pacific Coast League (2001-2010)
Location: 1844 Southwest Morrison Street (north, third base); Southwest 18th Avenue (east, left field); Multnomah Athletic Club building and Southwest Salmon Street (south, right field); Southwest 20th Avenue (west, first base)
Currently: Converted into a soccer-specific stadium from 2009–2011, and now known as Providence Park

Joe Etzel Field formerly Pilot Stadium
Home of:
Portland Pilots - NCAA (1988-present)
Location: Adjacent to the Chiles Center; North Portsmouth Street (south, first base); North Willamette Boulevard (west, third base).

See also
New Portland Ballpark, a planned stadium that was to be used by the Portland Beavers beginning in 2011, but ultimately never built
Lists of baseball parks
Charles B. Walker Stadium at Lents Park

Sources
Peter Filichia, Professional Baseball Franchises, Facts on File, 1993.
Phil Lowry, Green Cathedrals,  several editions.
Michael Benson, Ballparks of North America, McFarland, 1989.

P
Portland

Baseball
Baseball parks
Baseball in Portland, Oregon